Baghdad ER is a documentary released by HBO on May 21, 2006. It shows the Iraq War from the perspective of a military hospital in Baghdad. It has some relatively disturbing scenes in it (e.g. amputations), therefore the U.S. Army is officially warning that military personnel watching it could experience symptoms of post-traumatic stress disorder (PTSD).

After being given a Peabody Award, the show was featured in the April 13, 2007 broadcast of NPR's Fresh Air.

Awards and nominations

Awards

 Emmy Awards:
 Exceptional Merit in Nonfiction Filmmaking
 Outstanding Cinematography for Nonfiction Programming – Single-Camera
 Outstanding Directing for Nonfiction Programming
 Outstanding Sound Editing for Nonfiction Programming – Single or Multi-Camera
 Peabody Award
 2006

Nominations
 American Cinema Editors Awards:
 Best Edited Documentary Film 
 Emmy Awards:
 Outstanding Picture Editing for Nonfiction Programming – Single-Camera
 Outstanding Sound Mixing for Nonfiction Programming – Single or Multi-Camera

References

External links
 HBO schedule
 It can be watched and downloaded here (Information Clearing House)
 

Documentary films about the Iraq War
2006 television films
2006 films
American documentary films
2006 documentary films
Primetime Emmy Award-winning broadcasts
2000s English-language films
2000s American films